Bagh-e Pir or Bagh Pir or Bagh-i-Pir may refer to:
 Bagh-e Pir, Alborz
 Bagh Pir, Bushehr